James Kawika Piʻimauna "Rap" Reiplinger (July 16, 1950 – January 19, 1984) was a Hawaiian comedian, whose humor is an integral part of Hawaii today.

Biography 
After attending Punahou School, Reiplinger began performing professionally. In 1974 he helped create the comedy ensemble Booga Booga with James Grant Benton and Ed Ka'ahea. In 1982, he received an Emmy Award and bronze medal from the International Film and Television Festival of New York for the "Most Outstanding Television Production" for his television special, Rap′s Hawaii, which he wrote and starred in.

Reiplinger's writing, performance, and comic genius was part of the second Hawaiian Renaissance of the 1970s and 1980s.

Reiplinger was married to television journalist Leesa Clark Stone, from October 25, 1983, until his death on January 19, 1984. Reiplinger died in 1984 from cocaine-related causes at age 33, after going missing for a week.

Television 
 Rap's Hawai'i KGMB (1982)

Discography 
Poi Dog (1978)
Crab Dreams (1979) (Won a Na Hoku Hanohano award for Best Comedy Album in 1979.)
Do I Dare Disturb the Universe (1979)
Strange Bird (1981)
Rap′s Hawaii (TV Special) 1982 Emmy Award  (DVD 2003)
Towed Away (1983) (Won a Na Hoku Hanohano award for Best Graphics in 1984.)
Rap′s Aloha (TV Special) 1984 Broadcast posthumously.
Poi Dog With Crabs (1992) (Poi Dog and Crab Dreams) Released posthumously.
The Best of Rap (1993) Released posthumously.
The Best of Rap, Too (1996) Released posthumously.

References 

People from Hawaii
1950 births
1984 deaths
20th-century American comedians
American television personalities
Emmy Award winners
Punahou School alumni
Drug-related deaths in Hawaii
Na Hoku Hanohano Award winners